Thomas Swann (1809–1883) was the governor of Maryland, U.S.A.

Thomas Swann may also refer to:
Thomas Swann (attorney), lawyer who served as United States Attorney for the District of Columbia from 1821 to 1833
Thomas Burnett Swann (1928–1976), American poet, critic and fantasy author
Thomas Swann (rower) (born 1987), Australian rower

See also
Thomas Walter Swan (1877–1975),  U.S. Court of Appeals judge
Thomas Swan, a chemicals company in England